Liu Honglin (born 13 October 1976) is a Chinese athlete. He competed in the men's long jump at the 2000 Summer Olympics.

References

1976 births
Living people
Athletes (track and field) at the 2000 Summer Olympics
Chinese male long jumpers
Olympic athletes of China
Place of birth missing (living people)